The Richmond Planet was an African-American newspaper founded in 1882 in Richmond, Virginia. In 1938, when it merged with the Richmond Afro-American.

History 

The paper was founded in 1882 gathering in an upper room of a building located near the corner of Third and Broad streets thirteen former slaves (James H. Hayes, James H. Johnston, E.R. Carter, Walter Fitzhugh, George W. Lewis, James E. Robinson, Henry Hucles, Albert V. Norrell, Benjamin A. Graves, James E. Merriweather, Edward A. Randolph, William H. Andrews and Reuben T. Hill) who pooled their meager resources and started America’s oldest Negro newspaper on a career which was destined to play an important part in molding the opinions of Negroes in this city, state and nation. It was edited first by Edwin Archer Randolph and then by John Mitchell, Jr. from 1884 until his death in 1929. Mitchell was also president of the National Afro-American Press Association and the founder and president of Mechanics Savings Bank. By 1904 The Planet had reached a weekly circulation of 4,200. The paper continued publication until 1938, when it merged with the Richmond Afro-American.

The paper responded to the Racial Integrity Act of 1924. The work of photographer James C. Farley was published in the Planet. Farley served on the board of Mitchell Jr.'s Mechanics Savings Bank.

John Mitchell Jr. was the paper's junior editor in 1912. The same year the paper covered the opening of Lincoln Memorial Hall on the campus of Temperance, Industrial, and Collegiate Institute in Claremont, Virginia.

References

External links
 - Total pages: 291  

Defunct African-American newspapers
Mass media in Richmond, Virginia
Defunct newspapers published in Virginia